Rise and Shine is a 1941 American comedy crime film directed by Allan Dwan and starring Jack Oakie, George Murphy and Linda Darnell.

Plot

Cast
 Jack Oakie as Boley Bolenciecwcz  
 George Murphy as Jimmy McGonigle  
 Linda Darnell as Louise Murray  
 Walter Brennan as Grandpa 
 Milton Berle as Seabiscuit  
 Sheldon Leonard as Menace  
 Donald Meek as Professor Philip Murray  
 Ruth Donnelly as Mame Bacon 
 Raymond Walburn as Colonel Bacon  
 Donald MacBride as Coach Graham  
 Emma Dunn as Mrs. Murray  
 Charles Waldron as President 
 Mildred Gover as Mrs. Robertson  
 William Haade as Butch 
 Dick Rich as Gogo 
 John Hiestand as Announcer  
 Claire Du Brey as Miss Pinkham  
 Paul Harvey as Orville Turner

References

Bibliography
 Davis, Ronald L. Hollywood Beauty: Linda Darnell and the American Dream. University of Oklahoma Press, 2014.

External links
 

1941 films
1940s crime comedy films
1940s sports comedy films
American crime comedy films
American football films
Films based on biographies
Films based on works by James Thurber
Films directed by Allan Dwan
20th Century Fox films
American black-and-white films
American sports comedy films
1940s English-language films
1940s American films